Encarnación is a 2007 Argentine film directed and written by Anahí Berneri. It premiered on 11 October 2007. The film was produced by Daniel Burman and Diego Dubcovsky. Silvia Pérez was nominated for Best Actress and Best New Actress at the Argentine Film Critics Association Awards in 2008. The film won the best innovation award at the Toronto International Film Festival.

Cast
Silvia Pérez as  Erni
Martina Juncadella as  Ana
Carlos Portaluppi as Osmar Núñez
Marcelo Aguilar as Winery Owner
Fabián Arenillas
Luciano Cáceres
Osmar Núñez
Inés Saavedra

External links
 
 Encarnación at the cinenacional.com 

2007 films
Argentine drama films
2000s Spanish-language films
2000s Argentine films